The Africa General Service Medal, established in 1902, was a campaign medal of the United Kingdom. It was awarded for minor campaigns that took place in tropical Africa between 1900 and 1956, with a total of forty five clasps issued. The medal is never seen without a clasp and some are very rare.  Most medals were granted to British led local forces, including the King's African Rifles and the West African Frontier Force.  The only campaigns where European troops were present in any numbers were the various Somaliland campaigns, (including to the Royal Navy), and in Kenya.

Description 
 The obverse bears the uncrowned head, name and title of the reigning monarch.
 The reverse shows a symbolic design depicting Britannia standing with a lion and offering peace and law to Africa as a new day breaks, with the word AFRICA below. Save for the wording, the reverse design is the same as for the East and Central Africa Medal. The designer was George de Saulles
 The number, name and regiment of the recipient are inscribed on the rim of the medal in various styles.
 From 1920 a bronze oak leaf emblem is worn on the medal ribbon to signify a mention in dispatches for a campaign for which the medal was awarded.

Obverse variations 
The medal was awarded with one of three obverse designs.

Clasps 
The medal was never awarded without a clasp. While the majority of medals were awarded with one clasp, as many as seven clasps were earned by some African recipients.The forty five clasps authorised are listed below.

References

British campaign medals